Kojatice is a municipality and village in Třebíč District in the Vysočina Region of the Czech Republic. It has about 300 inhabitants.

Administrative parts
The village of Velký Újezd is an administrative part of Kojatice.

References

Villages in Třebíč District